Via Crucis (Way of the Cross), or Stations of the Cross, refers to a series of images depicting Jesus Christ on the day of his crucifixion and accompanying prayers.

Via Crucis may also refer to:

 Via Crucis to the Cruz del Campo, a religious procession in Seville, Spain
 Via crucis (Liszt), a musical work 
 Via Crucis and other Poems, a 2011 book of poetry by David Butler